Jesar is a small town and Taluka of Bhavnagar district of Gujarat.

Before independence it was capital of Jesar State, a small Princely State of India. Upon independence in 1947, the Princely State of Jesar was merged into Union of India to form a part of United State of Kathiawar a.k.a. Saurashtra State.

 Pin Code : 364510
 Language : Gujarati, Hindi and English
 District : Bhavnagar

Location on Google map link: https://goo.gl/maps/vVVrPXUw6z5gvfNq5

References

Cities and towns in Bhavnagar district